Eutonnoiria is a monotypic genus of moth flies in the subfamily Bruchomyiinae.

Species
Eutonnoiria edwardsi (Tonnoir, 1939)

Distribution
Uganda.

References

Nematocera genera
Endemic fauna of Uganda
Diptera of Africa
Psychodidae
Taxa named by Charles Paul Alexander